Arthur Laver (6 June 1880 – 6 July 1965) was a South African cricket umpire, born in Sydney, Australia. 

Laver umpired 21 first-class matches in South Africa between 1921 and 1935. He stood in 10 Test matches between 1921 and 1928.

See also
 List of Test cricket umpires

References

1880 births
1965 deaths
Sportspeople from Sydney
South African Test cricket umpires